Saint Ursus (Ours) of Auxerre (died 508 AD) was bishop of that city in the 6th century.  He had been a hermit at the church of Saint Amator before being elected bishop at the age of 75.  It is said he was elected after he had saved the town from a fire by his prayers.

External links
July 30: Ursus of Auxerre

508 deaths
Bishops of Auxerre
6th-century Burgundian bishops
French hermits
6th-century Frankish saints
Year of birth unknown